The Thar Express (Sindhi: ٿر ايڪسپريس) was an international passenger train that ran between the  a suburban area of Jodhpur in the Indian State of Rajasthan and  of Karachi in the Pakistani Province of Sindh.

It's a second train after the Samjhauta Express for direct connectivity between India and Pakistan on the basis of Simla Agreement after the restoring of the Jodhpur–Hyderabad rail route which was closed for 41 years till 2006.

As of 9 August 2019, the Thar Express had been cancelled until further notice due to escalating tensions between India and Pakistan.

History

During British rule, in 1892, the Hyderabad–Jodhpur Railway constructed the Jodhpur–Hyderabad mainline within two sections. The first section was Luni–Shadipalli section, which was a metre-gauge section line and the second section was Shadipalli–Hyderabad section, which was originally constructed as a  broad-gauge railway section line but due to less passenger transportation on that time it was converted to  metre gauge in the year 1901 and joined the first section of the mainline.

During the year 1901, the Sind Mail started running between Bombay (now Mumbai) and Karachi, the route of this train passed through Ahmedabad–Palanpur-Marwar-Pali-Luni–Munabao-Khokhrapar-Mirpur Khas and Hyderabad continued operation till 1947. After the Partition of India the rail links of Jodhpur State and Northern Bombay Presidency was disrupted, and divided into the Indian State of Rajasthan and Pakistan province of Sindh. Due to this, the mainline was separated as Jodhpur–Munabao line from the Indian side and Khokhrapar–Hyderabad line as of Pakistan side, on this purpose the origin of Sind Mail were shifted to Jodhpur in India and Hyderabad in Pakistan continued operation between two countries Until 1965, when the outbreak of the Indo-Pakistani War of 1965 led to the closure of all passenger train links. During that time, the rail track was bombed and destroyed by the Pakistani fighter jets, and the Bombay–Karachi train ended.

On 28 June 1976, India and Pakistan signed the rail communication agreement to normalize the relations between two nations after signing the Simla Agreement (2 July 1972) a few months after the end of Indo-Pakistani War of 1971, when the bilateral relations had soured after the Indian Army had succeeded in liberating Bangladesh. This agreement forms the basis of running Samjhauta Express also the Delhi–Lahore Bus and Srinagar–Muzaffarabad Bus are based on a separate agreement.

On the Indian side, the Jodhpur–Munabao line was totally converted into  broad gauge in the year 2003 and the Indian immigration and customs office developed at  railway station for customs checks which are currently carried out. Whereas on the Pakistan side, the Khokhrapar–Hyderabad line was totally re-converted back to the original  broad gauge and also the  railway station was also developed in the year 2006, a few hundred meters from the border, where immigration and customs checks are currently carried out. This enabled both the nations to sign an MoU to reopen the rail link. This was not possible earlier because there would be a change of gauge in between, either at Hyderabad or Mirpur Khas.

After gauge conversion of both nations, on 18 February 2006, the rail service of Thar Express was inaugurated on the basis of Simla Agreement and became the second route for connecting both nations after Samjhauta Express also the renewable rail communication agreement was regularly extended by both nations and the last extension was from 19 January 2016 to 18 January 2019.

Route and operations

Thar Express runs weekly with two portions. The entire stretch is covered by broad-gauge diesel locomotives. There are only one major river crossing, the more than 100 year old Kotri Bridge over the Indus River. this river crossing occurs in Pakistan.

Train schedule

Train departures are as follows:

Similarly, on returning the Pakistan portion of train begins its journey from Karachi Cantonment with time at 11:45 PM PKT with halts at Hyderabad Junction and Mirpur Khas Junction reaches Zero Point at 07:20 AM PKT for Pakistan immigration and customs checks. During that time the Indian portion train arrives on the station for boarding the passengers and leaves at 12:00 PM PKT crosses India–Pakistan border and reaches Munabao for Indian Immigration and customs checks, thereafter it leaves at 07:00 PM IST without any halts reaches Bhagat Ki Kothi (Jodhpur) at 11:50 PM IST.

Stations
  (Jodhpur)

References

External links
Photos of Mirpur Khas - Khokhrapar train photos at narrow-gauge.co.uk
14889 Thar Link Express at India Rail Info
14890 Thar Link Express at India Rail Info
405/406 Thar Express at Pak Information

India–Pakistan relations
International named passenger trains
Named passenger trains of India
Named passenger trains of Pakistan
Rail transport in Rajasthan
Railway services introduced in 2006
Transport in Jodhpur
Transport in Karachi
Transport in Sindh
2006 establishments in India
2006 establishments in Pakistan